Naihati Assembly constituency is an assembly constituency in North 24 Parganas district in the Indian state of West Bengal.

Overview
As per orders of the Delimitation Commission, No. 104 Naihati Assembly constituency is composed of the following: Naihati municipality, and Jethia, Kampa-Chakla, Majhipara–Palasi and Shibdaspur gram panchayats of Barrackpore I community development block.

Naihati Assembly constituency is part of No. 15 Barrackpore (Lok Sabha constituency).

Members of Legislative Assembly

Election results

2021

2011
In the 2011 election, Partha Bhowmick of Trinamool Congress defeated his nearest rival Ranjit Kundu of CPI(M).

.# Swing calculated on Congress+Trinamool Congress vote percentages taken together in 2006.

1977–2006
In the 2006, 2001 and 1996 state assembly elections, Ranjit Kundu of CPI (M) won the Naihati assembly seat defeating Dhillon Sarkar of Trinamool Congress in 2006, Tarun Adhikary of Trinamool Congress in 2001 and of Congress in 1996. Contests in most years were multi cornered but only winners and runners are being mentioned. Tarun Adhikary of Congress won the seat defeating Shyamal Bhattacharjee of JD in 1991 and Gopal Basu of CPI (M) in 1987. Ajit Basu of CPI (M) won the seat in 1982 defeating Ranjit Bhattacharya of Congress. Gopal Basu of CPI (M) won in 1977 defeating Jagadish Chakrabarty of Congress.

1951–1972
Tarapada Mukhopadhyay of Congress won in 1972. Gopal Basu of CPI(M) won in 1971 and 1969. G.Bhattacharya of Congress won in 1967. Gopal Basu of CPI won in 1962 and 1957. In independent India's first election in 1951 Suresh Chandra Pal of Congress won from Naihati.

References

Assembly constituencies of West Bengal
Politics of North 24 Parganas district